Boulenger's pipe snake (Cylindrophis boulengeri) is a species of nonvenomous snake in the family Cylindrophiidae. The species is endemic to Indonesia.

Etymology
The specific epithet, boulengeri, is in honor of Belgian-British herpetologist George Albert Boulenger.

Geographic range
Within Indonesia C. boulengeri is found on the Babar Islands, Timor, and Wetar.

Description
Dorsally, it is black; ventrally, it has alternating dark gray and yellowish crossbands.

Reproduction
C. boulengeri is viviparous.

References

Further reading
McDowell SB (1975). "A Catalogue of the Snakes of New Guinea and the Solomons, with Special Reference to Those in the Bernice P. Bishop Museum. Part II. Anilioidea and Pythoninae". Journal of Herpetology 9 (1): 1–79. (Cylindrophis boulengeri, p. 26).
Roux J (1911). "Elbert-Sunda-Expedition des Frankfurter Vereins für Geographie und Statistik. Reptilien und Amphibien ". Zoologische Jahrbücher, Abteilung für Systematik, Geographie und Biologie der Tiere, Jena 30: 495–508. (Cylindrophis boulengeri, new species, p. 500). (in German).

Cylindrophiidae
Reptiles described in 1911